Schinia mexicana is a moth of the family Noctuidae. It is found in Mexico and Southern Arizona.

External links
Images

Schinia
Moths of North America
Moths described in 1903